Miss Zambia is a national beauty pageant in Zambia.

Titleholders
Color key

References

External links
Official page
Miss World - Zambia

Zambia
Beauty pageants in Zambia
Recurring events established in 1974
Zambian awards